Bolshaya Kocha (Ydžyt Koća) is a rural locality (a selo) and the administrative center of Bolshekochinskoye Rural Settlement, Kochyovsky District, Perm Krai, Russia. The population was 538 as of 2010. There are 8 streets.

Geography 
Bolshaya Kocha is located 18 km northeast of Kochyovo (the district's administrative centre) by road. Abramovka is the nearest rural locality.

References 

Rural localities in Kochyovsky District